Victor of Capua (Victor Capuanus) was a sixth-century bishop of Capua, in Italy.

About his life nothing is known except what is found in his epitaph (C.I.L., 4503), which has been preserved, though the tomb itself has disappeared. This inscription simply states that his episcopate of thirteen years ended in April, 554. The authenticity of the inscription and its chronological data admit of no doubt. Victor is commemorated in the Roman Martyrology on 17 October, as "eruditione et sanctitate conspicus".

His original writings, preserved only in fragments, show him to have been a devoted student and a man of wide and varied learning. His best-known work is the Codex Fuldensis, one of the most ancient manuscripts of the Vulgate, prepared under his direction, and which he himself revised and corrected. In this codex the place of the Four Gospels is taken by a harmony of the Gospels, or as he himself terms it in the preface, a single Gospel composed from the four.

Victor was not certain that the harmony he used was identical with the Diatesseron of Tatian. The discovery of the text of the latter work and recent investigation have made it clear that this Latin harmony used by Victor was drawn up about A.D. 500. The anonymous author of this work simply substituted the Latin of St. Jerome's Vulgate for the Greek of Tatian, and at times changed the order or inserted additional passages. Many of the discrepancies may be due however to subsequent changes.

Other works by Victor were:

"De cyclo paschali" written about 550 in refutation of the "Cursus paschalis" of Victorius. Only a few fragments of this work have survived (Patrologia Latina, LXVIII, 1097–98; Jean Baptiste François Pitra, "Spic. Solesm.", I, 296)
commentaries on the Old and New Testament, for the most part catenae of quotations from the Greek exegetes
"Libelius reticulus seu de arca Noe" (Pitra, "Spic. Solesm.", I, 287), containing an ingenious allegorical computation showing that the dimensions of the ark typified the years of Christ's earthly life
"Capitula de resurrectione Domini" dealt with some of the chief difficulties regarding Christ's genealogy and the hour of the Crucifixion as recorded in the Evangelists.

References

 Ferdinando Ughelli, Italia sacra, VI, 306
 Jean Baptiste Francois Pitra, Spicilegium solesmense, I (Paris, 1852), p. 1 sq., 265 sq., 287, 296
 Theodor Zahn, Forschungen zur Geschichte des neutestamentlichen Kanons, II, 535
 Otto Bardenhewer (translator Thomas J. Shahan), Patrology, p. 628.
 

6th-century Italian bishops
Bishops of Capua
Medieval Italian theologians
6th-century Christian theologians
6th-century Italian writers
6th-century Latin writers